Shamsul Maidin (born 16 April 1966) is a Singaporean association football referee. He first became a referee in 1996 and retired in 2007.

AFC Director of Referees since 2016 Shamsul Maidin has contributed to the development of Asian Refereeing for over two decades as a match official, instructor and manager. Having represented Asia at the 2006 FIFA World Cup and the 2005 FIFA Confederations Cup, Shamsul Maidin was twice selected AFC Official of the Year in the mentioned consecutive years. He has also won the S.League Referee of the Year award four times, in 1997, 1998, 1999 and 2001.

Specialised in Human Resources studies, Shamsul is a former Football Association of Singapore (FAS) referee retired in 2007. Recognised for his experience as referee instructor and referee assessor at FIFA and AFC level, Shamsul was appointed as part of the instructors' team of the 2012 Olympic Games in London and the 2010 FIFA World Cup in South Africa. Other highlights of his career include the 2004, 2000 and 1996 AFC Asian Cup editions, as well as the 2003 and 2001 FIFA World Youth Championships. The Singaporean also became the only non-African match official at the 2006 African Cup of Nations and guided United Arab Emirates Football Association (UAEFA) referees as Technical Director from 2013 to 2015. 

He is currently leading the Referees Department of the Asian Football Confederation (AFC). Shamsul is the first Singaporean to be chosen as AFC's director of referees. Since January 2017, Shamsul is a member of the FIFA Referees Committee. Additionally, Shamsul is a member of the IFAB Technical Advisory Panel since 2016.

Career

International tournaments 
Shamsul has officiated in the 1996, 2000 and 2004 AFC Asian Cups, as well as the 2001 and 2003 FIFA World Youth Championship. He was also the only non-African referee at the 2006 African Cup of Nations.

Confederations Cup 
Shamsul had also officiated in the Argentina v Australia match in Nuremberg, in which Argentina won 4–2, during the 2005 FIFA Confederations Cup,

FIFA World Cup

2006 FIFA World Cup 
In 2006, Shamsul was selected by FIFA as one of the official referees for the 2006 FIFA World Cup in Germany. It was only the second time a Singaporean had taken part in a FIFA World Cup after George Suppiah in 1974, also held in Germany (then West Germany).

Shamsul took charge of the group stage game between Trinidad and Tobago and Sweden, brandishing the first red card of the tournament to Trinidad and Tobago's Avery John. He also officiated the group stage game between Mexico and Angola, sending off Angola's André Macanga, becoming the first referee of the tournament who sends off two players. Shamsul's appointment for the Mexico-Angola match saw him becoming the first Singaporean to referee more than one match at a World Cup Finals.

Shamsul also officiated the final Group A game between Poland and Costa Rica, becoming the first referee of the competition to perform in three matches. Finally, he was appointed as fourth official for the Round of 16 match between Germany and Sweden.

2010 FIFA World Cup 
In the 2010 World Cup in South Africa, Shamsul was appointed as a technical instructor by FIFA.

References

External links 
FIFA World Cup 2006

1966 births
Living people
FIFA World Cup referees
2006 FIFA World Cup referees
Singaporean football referees
Singaporean people of Malay descent
AFC Asian Cup referees